William Edward Bell (June 10, 1891 – June 3, 1952) was a Canadian professional ice hockey player.

Career 
Bell played four seasons in the National Hockey Association and six in the National Hockey League for the Montreal Wanderers, Montreal Canadiens and Ottawa Senators. He won the Stanley Cup in 1924 with the Canadiens.

After his retirement as a player, Bell went on to become an NHL referee. At the end of Game 4 of the 1927 Stanley Cup Finals, Bell was tackled by Boston Bruins defenseman Billy Coutu. Coutu also went after Bell's referee colleague Jerry Laflamme and was subsequently banned from the league for life.

Career statistics

Regular season and playoffs

External links

References

Notes

1891 births
1952 deaths
Anglophone Quebec people
Canadian ice hockey centres
Ice hockey people from Montreal
Montreal Canadiens players
Montreal Wanderers (NHA) players
Montreal Wanderers (NHL) players
Ottawa Senators (1917) players
Ottawa Senators (NHA) players
Ottawa Senators (original) players
People from Lachine, Quebec
Stanley Cup champions